Nince "Sekyanzi" Henry (born ) is a Ugandan song writer and a musician. He rose to prominence in Ugandas' music industry after writing successful songs to many of Uganda’s  big musicians in Uganda like Bebe Cool, Juliana Kanyomozi, Iryn Namubiru and others. As a singer Nince Henry has also released some songs which have won air play on Ugandas Radio stations, songs like Cinderella, Mali yangu, mpola mpola and others
He balances making music for other artistes and for himself as an artiste. In 2012, Nince had some song writing projects with juliana, following the writing of the song "Sikyakaaba" which juliana was supposed to release-however there were some unknown disagreements between the two parties (Nince and juliana) and the two musicians produced the same song with the same title and lyrics, this caused confusion over who owned the song, which aroused mistrust between the two musicians. In 2013 Nince staged his first concert "MPOLA MPOLA CONCERT"

Nince begun his music career as a song writer. but after making some good songs to other musicians, he also started making some music recordings and in 2011 he released a song, cinderella which gave him a breakthrough to the music industry of Uganda.

Discography
 Cinderella
 Mpola mpola
 Sikyakaaba
 Kabiriti
 Kaberebere
 Taata womuntu
 Basusi bamenvu
 Mali Yangu
 Tobalabula
 Dora Dora
 Time
 Killer Portion

Music Awards
Pam Awards - Best songwriter 2011,2012,2013 & 2014
 2014 Zinna Best Lyrics writer

References

1980s births
Living people
Ugandan songwriters